The 2012 Baylor Bears football team represented Baylor University in the 2012 NCAA Division I FBS football season. The team was coached by Art Briles and played its home games at Floyd Casey Stadium in Waco, Texas. The Bears were members of the Big 12 Conference. The conference slate began with a trip to Morgantown, West Virginia to take on the West Virginia Mountaineers, and concluded at home against the Oklahoma State Cowboys.  On December 2, Baylor accepted a berth in the 2012 Holiday Bowl to face #17 UCLA, where they defeated the Bruins, 49–26, on December 27.

Schedule

Rankings

Game summaries

SMU

Sources:

Baylor came into the game 71–35–4 in season openers; in the series history between Baylor and SMU, SMU held a slim lead at 36–35–7, including an 18–17–3 record in Waco. The Bears struck first, going ahead 14–0 in the first quarter on touchdown passes from quarterback Nick Florence to wide receiver Lanear Sampson and tight end Jordan Najvar. In the second quarter, SMU scored a field goal to make the score 14–3. In a subsequent drive, the Mustangs advanced to the Baylor 9-yard-line before a tipped Garrett Gilbert pass was intercepted.  Baylor scored a touchdown on the ensuing 75-yard, 39 second, three play drive to increase its lead to 21–3.  That touchdown represented the first of 31 unanswered Baylor points in the second and third quarters, leaving Baylor with a commanding lead of 45–3 before SMU scored a touchdown with 1:58 remaining in the 3rd quarter.  Both teams would tack on a pair of touchdowns in the fourth quarter, with both teams' last touchdowns coming on passes from their backup quarterbacks (Baylor's Brice Petty and SMU's Conner Preston).  The Bears' 59–24 win was their 7th consecutive win since the team's loss to Oklahoma State (October 29, 2011), and the fifth consecutive game that the Baylor offense scored 40 points or more.

Sam Houston State

Sources:

The Bears and Bearkats met each other for the fourth time in school history. All 4 games have been in Waco. Baylor owned a 3–0 advantage. SHSU was led by quarterback Brian Bell, the younger brother of former Baylor quarterback Shawn Bell (2003–2006).  The teams traded field goals in a low-scoring first quarter, and SHSU dominated the second quarter, taking a 20–10 lead into the half.  Baylor, however, dominated the second half, outscoring the Bearkats 38–3, with Florence chalking up two touchdown passes and running backs Glasco Martin IV and Lache Seastrunk adding touchdown runs of 5 and 15 yards, respectively.  Darius Jones provided the Bears' final touchdown, returning an interception 73 yards to seal a 48–23 Baylor victory.

Louisiana–Monroe

Sources:

The Bears and the Warhawks had never met prior to this Friday night game in the fourth week of the 2012 season.  In the preceding two weeks, the Warhawks had stunned the college football world by defeating then #8 Arkansas 34–31 in overtime and taking Auburn to overtime in a 31–28 loss at Auburn. With excitement surrounding the Louisiana-Monroe program at an all-time high, the Bears traveled to Monroe to face the Warhawks in their home opener before a Malone Stadium-record crowd of 31,175.  ULM struck first, capitalizing on two interceptions to take a 14–0 lead in the 1st quarter.  Baylor outscored the Warhawks 34–14 in the next two quarters, and took a 34–28 lead into the fourth with ULM driving.  The Warhawks would score on their drive spanning the third and fourth quarters to go ahead 35–34, but the Bears would answer with a 14-play, 73-yard drive of their own to go ahead 40–35 (a two-point conversion attempt failed).  Baylor subsequently forced a fumble and drove down the field for another touchdown to make the score 47–35. ULM, fighting to the end, struck back to score a touchdown and pull within 5 points of Baylor; however, with only 6 seconds remaining, the subsequent onside kick was recovered by the Bears.  The victory represented Baylor's ninth consecutive win, which at the time was the second-longest winning streak in the nation behind TCU.  The game also represented the Bears' seventh consecutive game in which they scored more than 40 points.

West Virginia

Sources:

In this first-ever meeting of the two schools, #25 Baylor traveled to Morgantown, West Virginia to take on early Heisman favorite Geno Smith and the #9 ranked Mountaineers in their Big XII conference debut. With the teams featuring offenses among the best and defenses among the worst that the FBS had to offer, the stage was set for an offensive shootout. After an early Nick Florence interception led to a WVU drive capped by a missed field goal, the offenses matched each other score for score in a first half which saw 10 touchdowns in 15 drives. The half concluded dramatically: with WVU leading 35–28, Florence was forced from the pocket and, inches from crossing the line of scrimmage, unleashed a 67-yard touchdown pass while scrambling as time expired.  The teams went into the half tied 35–35.  West Virginia pulled away in the 3rd quarter with 21 points to Baylor's 7 and clung tenaciously to the lead, scoring two more touchdowns in the 4th to Baylor's three. The Mountaineers' victorious Big XII debut proved to be a record-setting affair: Geno Smith tied a conference record with eight passing touchdowns (having completed 45/51 attempts, he finished the game with more touchdown passes than incompletions); Nick Florence and Geno Smith set school records for single-game passing yardage (581 and 656 yards, respectively); West Virginia set a school record for total yardage (807 yards); Stedman Bailey hauled in a school record 5 touchdown receptions; and Bailey also set a Big XII conference record for single-game receiving yards (303 yards) only to see that surpassed moments later by Baylor's Terrance Williams, who finished with 314 receiving yards. Following the game, WVU moved to #8 in the AP poll, and Baylor dropped from the rankings. With 133 points combined, this game was the highest-scoring FBS game of 2012.

TCU

Sources:

Following their first defeat of the season, the Bears returned to Waco to take on the second Big 12 newcomer, a TCU Horned Frogs team suffering from attrition both on and off the field.  Veteran TCU quarterback Casey Pachall had been suspended from the team less than two weeks prior, and freshman Trevon Boykin was slated to start his second game ever against Baylor.  The game started well for the Bears, as Florence connected with Williams for a touchdown on the second offensive play of the game.  But then the Baylor offense began to implode as Boykin and TCU responded to tie the game at 7–7 after the first of 4 Florence interceptions and 6 total turnovers on the day.  TCU tacked on another touchdown to go into the half leading 14–7.  During the third quarter the teams traded scores evenly to go to the fourth with the score 28–21 in favor of TCU.  The fourth quarter was dominated by the Horned Frogs, who scored 3 touchdowns and held Baylor scoreless.  The loss snapped Baylor's home winning streak and ended Baylor's streak of games in which they scored 40+ points.

Texas

Sources:

A wild shootout in Austin ended with Baylor falling just short of a third consecutive victory over the Longhorns.  Texas scored first on an 84-yard touchdown rush by Daje Johnson on the first play from scrimmage, and forced a Baylor punt.  However, the Bears stopped the ensuing Texas drive, and an errant long snap with the Longhorns in punt formation led to an 8-yard Florence touchdown rush to tie the game.  The teams scored a combined 10 touchdowns in a first half that ended with an Aaron Jones field goal to bring the Bears to within 11 points of Texas.  In the third quarter, Baylor scored nine points on a field goal and a touchdown (failed two-point conversion) to close to 40–42.  But Texas held, scoring two more touchdowns and holding Baylor to a field goal on a subsequent scoring drive to maintain a 6-point lead.  The 106 points scored was the most in any Longhorn football game since 1950, and the Longhorns yielded the most points in school history (50) in a winning effort.

Iowa State

Sources:

After three straight losses, the Bears travelled to Ames, Iowa to take on an Iowa State team that had beaten TCU at home and played respectably against conference leader Kansas State.  The game, played on a cold October night, had more than its share of dropped passes and offensive miscues.  Iowa State attempted an onside kick to open the game that was recovered by Baylor; however, a Florence fumble in the end zone meant that the Bears would have to wait until more than midway through the first quarter to put up the game's first points.  Iowa State scored a touchdown in the first quarter to tie the game, and scored two more to Baylor's one in the second quarter to take a 21–14 lead into the half.  The Bears continued to fight in the second, stopping a Cyclone drive with an interception in the red zone, but in a low-scoring second half Baylor's offense was able to reach the end zone only once more.  In the meantime, ISU quarterback Steele Jantz set career highs for passing and touchdowns, tacking on two more passing touchdowns in the second half to go with his three from the first, and preserving the 35–21 victory for Iowa State.

Kansas

Sources:

Back in Waco against the Jayhawks, Baylor jumped out to a 14–0 lead early behind two stops by the defense.  A 59-yard touchdown rush by Kansas put them back in the game, but Baylor drove back down the field for a field goal and then stopped a Jayhawk drive early in the 2nd quarter that ended with a failed fake field goal rush at the Baylor 14-yard line.  Subsequent offensive drives for both teams stalled until Kansas' Cummings, despite injuring his leg on the run, limped ahead of the Baylor defense into the end zone to make the game 17–14.  Baylor managed another field goal to increase its lead to 6, and the teams went into the half with Baylor up 20–14.  Lightning delayed the start of the second half for about 30 minutes; by the time the teams resumed play, a steady drizzle had begun.  The Bears came up with a big stop on the first Jayhawk drive of the second half, with Kansas turning the ball over on downs near the Baylor 45.  Baylor promptly punched the ball into the endzone on a Bryce Petty rush to make the score 27–14.  A Joe Williams interception offered the Bears the chance to increase their lead, but their ensuing drive stalled.  However, the Bears picked off Cummings again on the next drive, this time the interception coming from Ahmad Dixon, and Nick Florence added a rushing touchdown on the subsequent drive.  Baylor would add one more touchdown in the 4th quarter, while holding Kansas scoreless throughout the second half to snap a 4-game losing streak.

Oklahoma

Sources:

Following their 4th win of the year against the Jayhawks in Waco, Baylor traveled to Norman to face a tough #12 Oklahoma Sooners team that had two home losses on the season (Kansas State and Notre Dame).  The teams alternated scoring in the first half, with Oklahoma holding Baylor to a field-goal on their first scoring drive to take a 28–17 lead into the half.  In the third quarter, Baylor struck first, scoring a field goal and then a touchdown to pull to within 2 of the Sooners (an attempted two-point conversion following the touchdown failed).  Oklahoma's offense answered the challenge, however, with two touchdowns in the third and fourth quarters, one a 55-yard Blake Bell rush.  Lache Seastrunk added a rushing touchdown late in the game and Nick Florence rushed for a successful two-point conversion to bring the Bears to within a touchdown of Oklahoma, but with less than 1:30 left in the game, Oklahoma ran out the clock for the win.  Baylor fell to 4–5 on the season.

Kansas State

Sources:

One week after falling in Norman, and almost a year to the day after the Bears' BCS-shaking first victory against Oklahoma, the Bears again took on a top 5 opponent in Waco.  This time the opponent was 10–0 Kansas State, ranked #1 in the BCS after an Alabama loss the previous week and clear favorites in their final two games of the year, at Baylor and vs. Texas.  As so often during the season, the quick-strike Baylor offense put the Bears ahead early on a 38-yard Florence pass to Tevin Reese.  Kansas State answered when then-Heisman favorite Collin Klein completed a touchdown pass to tie the game 7–7.  Baylor subsequently put up 21 unanswered points to go ahead 28–7 before the Wildcats managed 10 more points in the final two minutes of the first half.  In the third quarter, Baylor put up another touchdown (a 4-yard Glasco Martin IV rush) and forced a Kansas State punt that pinned Baylor on their own 1-yard line.  Two plays later, Florence attempted a quick pass to Terrance Williams that was intercepted on the 2-yard line, setting up a Collin Klein touchdown rush that made the score 35–24 in Baylor's favor.  The Bears went on to rack up 17 more points in the third quarter, the last touchdown coming on an 80-yard Lache Seastrunk rush after Joe Williams intercepted Klein in the endzone (the third of Klein's three interceptions on the night).  With 58 seconds remaining in the third quarter following Seastrunk's touchdown, Kansas State embarked upon an 8-minute, 21 play, 74-yard drive that brought the Wildcats to first-and-goal from the Baylor 6-yard line.  An inspired Baylor defense turned in the goal-line stand of their season, halting four straight Collin Klein rushes and forcing a turnover on downs.  Baylor would subsequently almost completely run down the clock, picking up 4 first downs on 10 straight rushes before punting the ball back to Kansas State with only 32 seconds left in the game.  The victory was Baylor's first ever over a #1 ranked opponent (the 1956 team defeated #2 Tennessee in the 1957 Sugar Bowl, and the 1941 team tied #1 Texas) and represented only the fifth time in the BCS era that the #1 ranked team lost to an unranked opponent.  The win took Baylor to 5–5 on the season, needing one more victory for bowl eligibility.

Texas Tech

Sources:

The Bears and Red Raiders again met at Cowboys Stadium to renew their rivalry.  Texas Tech jumped out to an early 21–7 lead after the Red Raider defense shut down the Baylor offense in the red zone and Aaron Jones missed two field goals early in the game.  Near the end of the second quarter Texas Tech was driving to go into halftime up by three touchdowns; however, a fumble inside Baylor territory led to a quick-strike Baylor scoring drive capped by a 39-yard Florence touchdown pass to Tevin Reese.  Texas Tech got the ball to start the second half and put themselves ahead by 10 with a field goal.  After Baylor answered two drives later with a touchdown, Leon Mackey fielded the ensuing kickoff and returned it for a 97-yard touchdown.  The Bears answered with a touchdown drive to close the deficit to 28–31 with just over 2 minutes left in the 3rd.  Subsequently, Baylor linebacker Eddie Lackey returned a Seth Doege interception for a touchdown to give Baylor its first lead of the game.  Baylor picked up another TD and the Red Raiders tacked own two touchdowns before Aaron Jones kicked his only good field goal of the night, a 22 yarder that tied the game up at 45.  With 2:48 left in the game, Texas Tech began a drive which ended with another Doege interception, this time a screen pass deflected off a Red Raider lineman's helmet into Lackey's arms.  After Jones missed a game-winning field goal, Baylor scored on its opening overtime possession on a Glasco Martin IV touchdown rush.  Texas Tech subsequently failed to convert on 4th and 5, giving Baylor its 6th win of the season.

Oklahoma State

Sources:

With bowl eligibility already assured, Baylor now looked to improve their bowl berth against Oklahoma State.  The teams traded field goals, and then Eddie Lackey, the previous week's Big 12 defensive player of the week, returned a Clint Chelf interception for a touchdown.  Baylor tacked on two more touchdowns, scoring 24 unanswered points before Oklahoma State again found the end zone.  The subsequent Baylor drive stalled after a controversial Seastrunk fumble, and the Cowboys capitalized again to make the score 17–24 in favor of the Bears.  Fighting back, Baylor scored another touchdown and added a second interception, this time by Mike Hicks.  An Aaron Jones field goal attempt following the interception was blocked, and the teams entered the half with the score Baylor 31, Oklahoma State 17.  In the second half, Oklahoma State fought to close the gap, drawing to within 7 of the Bears before Seastrunk rushed 76 yards for a touchdown despite suffering a quadriceps cramp with 45 yards to go.  Oklahoma State scored once more to again close to within 7 but with just over a minute left in the game, Baylor was able to run out the clock to cap a 7 win season.

Holiday Bowl

Sources: 

On December 2, 2012, Baylor accepted its first-ever berth in the Holiday Bowl.  The Bears would face the #17 UCLA Bruins, winners of the Pac-12 South Division, for the first time in school history.  After both teams' first drives ended in punts, Baylor's Glasco Martin IV rushed for a touchdown from 4 yards out to cap the Bears' second drive.  That touchdown represented the first of 21 unanswered points for Baylor, including touchdown receptions by Tevin Reese and Antwan Goodley.  Sterling defensive play by Baylor held UCLA scoreless until midway through the 2nd quarter – Baylor's defense, which had tallied 13 total sacks all season, recorded 5 sacks of UCLA quarterback Brett Hundley in the first half while shutting down UCLA's attempts to rush.  UCLA finally got on the board with just over six minutes left in the first half, scoring a touchdown on a 2-play, 21-yard drive set up by a Jordan Najvar fumble.  Baylor would answer on its subsequent two drives, with Martin IV adding a 26-yard touchdown run and Lache Seastrunk rushing for a 43-yard touchdown.  With time winding down in the first half, UCLA tacked on a field-goal and the teams went to halftime with Baylor leading 35–10.

UCLA received the ball to start the second half, but turned the ball over on downs at the Baylor 48.  The Bears' ensuing drive faltered, however, and Baylor was forced to punt the ball back to the Bruins, who put together a 9-play, 58-yard drive culminating in a second UCLA field goal.  Late in the 3rd quarter, Glasco Martin IV rushed the ball in for his third touchdown of the game, this time from 1 yard out.  In the 4th, UCLA added a touchdown following a Baylor fumble, but an attempted 2-point conversion failed.  Nick Florence tacked on Baylor's final touchdown of the game with a 1-yard rush of his own at the 7:46 mark of the 4th.  After UCLA turned the ball over on downs in their ensuing possession, Baylor took possession and ran the clock down to 8 seconds before turning the ball over on downs at their own 34.  With time for one play left in the game, Hundley completed a pass to Logan Sweet for a 34-yard touchdown. The play was not reviewed during the game, but replays appeared to show that Sweet was down at the 1-yard line.

While the score of the game is officially 49–26, Baylor Head Coach Art Briles ignored the final touchdown and had the score changed to 49–19 on the championship rings presented to Baylor players commemorating the victory. CBSSports.com called the changing of the score "an arrogant move."

Baylor finished the game with 494 total yards, 306 of which came on the ground.  138 of those yards came from Lache Seastrunk, who finished with one rushing touchdown and was named the offensive player of the game.  The Bears' offense, typically known for its aerial attack, attempted only 13 passes for 10 completions and 188 yards.  That passing yardage, however, was sufficient to allow Nick Florence to finish the season with 4,309 passing yards, overtaking Robert Griffin III's school record 4,293 passing yards, set during his 2011 Heisman-winning campaign.  The Baylor defense, which entered the game ranked among the worst of FBS schools, allowed the Bears to overcome three turnovers.  Although the defense created no turnovers of its own, Baylor sacked Hundley 6 times, limited UCLA to only 33 total yards on the ground, and allowed the Bruins to convert on only 1 of 17 third downs.  Two of Baylor's sacks came from defensive end Chris McAllister, who was named the defensive player of the game.  The victory gave the Bears bowl wins in consecutive seasons for the second time in school history (1985 Liberty Bowl, 1986 Bluebonnet Bowl; 2011 Alamo Bowl, 2012 Holiday Bowl).

References

Baylor
Baylor Bears football seasons
Holiday Bowl champion seasons
Baylor Bears football